Don Francisco (born February 28, 1946) is an independent American singer, songwriter, and musician, specializing in the field of contemporary Christian music. He has won two Dove awards, 1980 song of the year (for "He's Alive"), and 1980 Songwriter of the year.

Background
Don Francisco was born in Louisville, Kentucky, the son of a Christian seminary professor Clyde T. Francisco. Francisco pursued a career in secular music before rededicating his life to God after an experience he believed was supernatural. Francisco has a son Uri (born 1974) with his first wife Karen, from whom he divorced in 1994. Francisco is currently married to his second wife, Wendy (previously married to the singer Terry Talbot), who is also a recording artist as well as a graphic artist, and lives in Colorado.

Music career
In 1977 Don Francisco recorded "I Don't Care Where You've Been Sleeping" for the album Forgiven. It is one of the most uncompromising songs he has ever written and it is considered by many to be one of his best songs. Benson Records re-released the original album Forgiven along with Got to Tell Somebody, and put them both on one CD in 1988. That re-release left the song "I Don't Care Where You've Been Sleeping" off in order to fit both albums on one 70-minute CD. However, they did release the Forgiven album in the early 1990s with that song on it, along with all others, on their "Right Price" line of CDs.

Eventually after 1994, Don Francisco opted to operate independently, which, while affording him more control, seems to have had no ill effect on his musical output or quality. On the contrary, albums released after have gradually gained the use of further session work and demonstrate an even greater range of styles.

In 2003 Francisco released The Promises, which consists almost entirely of selected and paraphrased readings from the Bible. The disk is a collaboration between Don and his wife Wendy.

Musical style
Francisco's style is fairly distinctive, focusing on acoustic instruments barren of modern production techniques and concentrates on the narratives of the songs, using ballad styles or speaking through the music that interprets Scriptural events or Biblical lessons. This is specifically with respect to the teachings of Jesus Christ and his messages of "unconditional love" ("I Don't Care Where You've Been Sleeping"), salvation ("Give Your Heart a Home"), and a lesson against religious self-righteousness and pharisaic condemnation ("Beautiful To Me"). As is the case with many singer-songwriters advocating a specific religious belief or philosophical viewpoint through music, Francisco uses his adaptations and interpretations as the means to convey what he feels are the most important teachings of the JudeoChristian scriptures.

Some of Don Francisco's songs deal with what his site calls Churchianity where the habit of church life replaces actual Christianity.

Barred from the UK
In March 2009, Don Francisco was scheduled to perform in an Easter music program called "Why Good Friday?" in the English port town of Poole in Dorset, but was barred from entering the United Kingdom after listing his occupation as "gospel singer" and failing to obtain a religious worker visa and a certificate of sponsorship, a new requirement that the organizers of the concert were unaware of.  That year the United Kingdom phased in an immigration system that increased scrutiny for religious workers traveling to the country.

Discography

Studio albums
 1976 Brother of the Son
 1977 Forgiven
 1979 Got to Tell Somebody
 1981 The Traveler
 1984 Holiness
 1985 One Heart at a Time
 1987 The Power
 1988 High Praise
 1991 Vision of the Valley
 1992 Come Away
 1994 Genesis and Job
 1999 Grace on Grace
 2001 Only Love is Spoken Here
 2003 The Promises (Spoken Word)
 2005 That I May Know You
 2007 The Sower
 2009 Let It Ride
 2012 Carols on Guitar
 2014 Forever My Friend

Live albums
 1982 The Live Concert
 1989 Live in the UK
 2017 Acoustic Live Concert (two-CD)

Compilations
 1985 The Poet
 1991 The Early Works
 1996 Word Pictures
 1999 Balladeer Tales
 1996 He's Alive, Collection Vol. I
 1998 Beautiful To Me, Collection Vol. II
 2004 The Package, Collection Vol. III

References

External links
  - contains albums, MP3s, a member area with lyrics and guitar chords, and ministry updates
 

1946 births
Living people
Musicians from Louisville, Kentucky
American performers of Christian music
Singers from Kentucky
Songwriters from Kentucky